Hiding in the Mirror is a popular science book by the theoretical physicist Lawrence M. Krauss. The text was initially published on October 20, 2005 by Viking Press. This is his seventh non-fiction book.

Synopsis
The work draws on the works of scientists, mathematicians, artists, and writers to consider the cultural and scientific aspects of extra dimensions. The book explores popular theories about such topics as black holes, life in other dimensions, and string theory.

Review
A reviewer of Publishers Weekly mentioned "Physicist Krauss offers an erudite and well-crafted overview of the role multiple dimensions have played in the history of physics. This isn't an easy book, even with a writer as talented as Krauss (whom some will recognize as the author of The Physics of Star Trek and Beyond Star Trek) serving as one's Virgil. Long on science and short on its connections with culture, the book is essentially an introduction to the physics and mathematics of extra dimensions with a few more or less disconnected chapters that touch on how these ideas show up in art and popular culture; there's more on brane-world and the ekpyrotic universe than on Plato's cave, whose inhabitants could not perceive reality in all its dimensions, or Buckaroo Banzai."

See also
Euclidean space
Fourth dimension in art
Four-dimensionalism
Fifth dimension
Sixth dimension

Similar books
Flatland, a book by Edwin A. Abbott about two- and three-dimensional spaces, to understand the concept of four dimensions
Sphereland, an unofficial sequel to Flatland
The Fourth Dimension by Rudy Rucker
Warped Passages, a book by Lisa Randall

References

Further reading

External links

Popular science books
2005 non-fiction books
Books by Lawrence M. Krauss